Lake Granbury is a North Texas reservoir near Granbury, Texas. It was created in 1969 and is one of three lakes damming the Brazos River.

Lake Granbury is contained by the De Cordova Bend Dam and is a long, narrow lake, encompassed by 103 miles (221 km) of shoreline.

The lake is controlled by the Brazos River Authority in Granbury.

History

The lake was first proposed in the late 1950s.  Construction began on the Cordova Bend Dam on December 15, 1966 by the Zachry Construction Company.  Impoundment of water began on September 15, 1969.

The proposed construction of the De Cordova Bend Dam in the mid-1950s became the impetus for John Graves' book, Goodbye to a River.

Fish populations

 Largemouth bass
 Striped bass
 White bass
 Channel catfish
 Flathead catfish
 White crappie
 Sunfish
 Longnose Gar

The lake is annually stocked with bass and in past years with  catfish.

Recreational uses

 Boating
 Wakeboarding
 Water skiing
 Fishing

Recreational areas

 Thorp Spring
 Hunter Park
 City Park
 Rough Creek
 De Cordova Bend

References

External links
 Lake Granbury - Texas Parks and Wildlife
 

Reservoirs in Texas
Brazos River Authority
Protected areas of Hood County, Texas
Bodies of water of Hood County, Texas